Steve Berry is an American politician from the state of Vermont. A member of the Democratic Party, he represented the Bennington-4 district in the Vermont House of Representatives from 2015 to 2017.

References

Democratic Party members of the Vermont House of Representatives
Living people
Year of birth missing (living people)